Ausgram II is a community development block that forms an administrative division in Bardhaman Sadar North subdivision of Purba Bardhaman district in the Indian state of West Bengal.

History

Pandu Rajar Dhibi
In 1962, excavation were initiated at Rajpotadanga village, near the southern bank of the Ajay River in the area and it was extended in 1965. The excavations at Pandu Rajar Dhibi have revealed the traces of a 3,500-year-old civilisation similar to that of Harappa-Mohenjo-daro. There also are indications of links with the Minoan civilization of Crete. The excavated items have been added to the collection of the State Archaeological Gallery.

Further excavations were carried out in 1985 by the state department of archaeology. The main mound at Pandu Rajar Dhibi is associated with King Pandu mentioned in Mahabharata. The 1985 excavation has clearly shown that there were six periods of occupation at the sites. There were two main periods – the Chalcolithic period around 1600 BC – 750 BC, and the Iron Age. The excavation at Pandu Rajar Dhibi has provided evidence for the gradual growth of a Chalcolithic culture and its displacement by iron-using people.

Medieval history
The area between the Damodar and Ajay was known as Gopbhum, where the Sadgope kings ruled for many centuries, prior to the advent of the Muslims. The Sura kings also occupy a somewhat mythical position in the region. Adi Sura of this dynasty is credited with having brought the five Brahmins and Kayasthas (two important upper castes in Bengal) from Kannauj in what is now Uttar Pradesh.Around the 11th century, King Mahindranath ruled from his fort at Amrargar. One can see the elementary remains of the foundation of a fort.

In the 18th century the area faced massive attacks of the Bargi warriors.

Movements
This being a canal-irrigated area it had faced agitations against the imposition of taxes for canal water.

Damage to embankments of the Ajay and consequent flooding was a regular problem in the Ausgram and Mangalkot area. The devastating flood of 1943 caused immense suffering and lead to a mass movement for restoration/ repair of the embankments. A massive meeting was organised at Guskara in 1944, with Uday Chand Mahtab, Maharaja of Bardhaman. However, the government did not take any action,. Ultimately, the Communist Party, which had been at the forefront of agitations for some years, provided a huge work force for the purpose and completed the repair work. It laid the foundation for the party's popularity in the area.

Geography

Location

Ausgram II CD Block is part of the Kanksa Ketugram plain, which lies along the Ajay. The river forms a boundary with Birbhum district on the north for a long stretch and then flows through district. The uneven laterite territory found in the western part of Bardhaman district extends up to Ausgram and then the alluvial flood plains commence. The entire Durgapur-Kanksa-Faridpur-Ausgram area was densely forested even in more recent times. The influx of refugees from East Pakistan and their rehabilitation in the area, and the irrigation facilities extended by Damodar Valley Corporation led to destruction of much of the forests in the area, but some still remain.

Ausgram II CD Block is bounded by Ilambazar and Bolpur Sriniketan CD Blocks, in Birbhum district, on the north, Ausgram I CD Block on the east, Galsi I CD Block on the south and Kanksa CD Block on the west.

Ausgram II CD Block has an area of 360.45 km2. It has 1 panchayat samity, 7 gram panchayats, 113 gram sansads (village councils), 106 mouzas and 102 inhabited villages. Aushgram and Bud Bud police stations serve this block. Headquarters of this CD Block is at Amrargar.

With water from several small streams swelling it during the monsoons, Kunur River often floods large areas of Ausgram and Mangalkot police station areas.

Ramnabagan Wildlife Sanctuary, established in 1981 and covering an area of 0.14 km2 forms a part of Ausgram II block.

Gram panchayats of Ausgram II block/panchayat samiti are: Amarpur, Balki, Bhedia, Debsala, Eral, Kota and Ramnagar.

Demographics

Population
As per the 2011 Census of India Ausgram II CD Block had a total population of 150,896, all of which were rural. There were 77,184 (51%) males and 73,712 (49%) females. Population below 6 years was 17,204. Scheduled Castes numbered 57,141 (37.87%) and Scheduled Tribes numbered 21,759 (14.42%).

 census, Ausgram II block had a total population of 136,235, out of which 69,913 were males and 66,322 were females. Ausgram II block registered a population growth of 14.46 per cent during the 1991-2001 decade. Decadal growth for Bardhaman district was 14.36 per cent. Decadal growth in West Bengal was 17.84 per cent. Scheduled castes at 54,111 formed around one-third the population. Scheduled tribes numbered 19,355.

Large villages (with 4,000+ population) in Ausgram II CD Block are (2011 census figures in brackets): Debshala (4,090), Kota Chandipur (5,177), Chhora (6,145), Pubar (4,167), Amragar (4,397), Eral (4,612), Sar (4,317) and Bhedia (5,882).

Other villages in Ausgram II CD Block included (2011census figures in brackets): Amarpur (1,721), Ramnagar (1,480), Bhalki (2,997), Abhirampur, Aduria, Akulia, Amrargar, Aogram, Arjuri, Babuisol, Bagbati, Bahadurpur, Baksibad Pogram, Balarambati, Balarampur, Banktara, Bankul, Baradoba, Bhatkunda, Bhiti, Bhuyera, Bijyapur, Bilaspur, Bilshanda, Bishnupur, Brahmandihi, Budra, Chak Piariganj, Chak Radhamohanpur, Chak Tilang, Chandipur, Chandradwip, Chhora, Chhota Ramchandrapur, Raikona, Debshala, Dhantor, Dharala, Dhonkora, Dombandi, Eral, Genrai, Gobindapur, Gohalara, Gopalmath, Gopalpota, Gopalpur, Goswami Kanda Mullikpur, Harinarayanpur, Harinathpur, Harishpur, Hodogarya, Jalalpur, Jalikandar, Jamtara, Jayrampur, Jinjira, Kakra, Kalaijhuti, Khandari, Khatnagar, Khorda Dwariapur, Kota Chandipur, Kuldiha, Kural, Kantatikuri, Lachminarayanpur, Lakshminarayanpur Chak, Madanmohonpur, Majuria, Malacha, Maliara, Maukhira, Mokota, Nawapara, Nrisinhapur, Paduma, Panch Mahali, Panduk, Parisha, Pashchim Chandipur, Phanrijangal, Pondali, Pratappur, Premganja, Pubar, Purucha, Radhaballabhpur, Radhamohanpur, Raghunathpur, Ramharipur, Ramnagar (Uttar), Ramnagar Chak, Rangakhila, Reora, Salko, Samantapara, Satla, Shiuli, Shrichandrapur, Shyamsundarpur, Sonai, Sonaiaima, Sonaiaima Purba, Suata and Tilang.

Literacy
As per the 2011 census the total number of literates in Ausgram II CD Block was 90,916 (68.00% of the population over 6 years) out of which males numbered 51,580 (75.26% of the male population over 6 years) and females numbered 39,336 (60.37% of the female population over 6 years). The gender disparity (the difference between female and male literacy rates) was 14.89%.

As per 2001 census, Ausgram II block had a total literacy of 62.53% for the 6+ age group. While male literacy was 72.80% female literacy was 51.69 per cent. Bardhaman district had a total literacy of 70.18%, male literacy being 78.63% and female literacy being 60.95&.

See also – List of West Bengal districts ranked by literacy rate

Languages and religion

In the 2011 census Hindus numbered 116,677 and formed 77.32% of the population in Ausgram II CD Block. Muslims numbered 32,217 and formed 21.35% of the population. Christians numbered 523 and formed 0.35% of the population. Others numbered 1,497 and formed 0.98% of the population.

In Bardhaman district the percentage of Hindu population has been declining from 84.3% in 1961 to 77.9% in 2011 and the percentage of Muslim population has increased from 15.2% in 1961 to 20.7% in 2011.

At the time of the 2011 census, 85.24% of the population spoke Bengali and 12.86% Santali as their first language.

Rural poverty
As per poverty estimates obtained from household survey for families living below poverty line in 2005, rural poverty in Ausgram II CD Block was 44.85%.

Economy

Livelihood
In Ausgram II CD Block in 2011, amongst the class of total workers, cultivators formed 16.18%, agricultural labourers 59.19%, household industry workers 5.13% and other workers 19.50%.

In Ausgram II CD Block, cultivators or agricultural labourers formed a large proportion of the workforce, comparatively less workers were engaged in the secondary and tertiary sectors.

Infrastructure
There are 102 inhabited villages in Ausgram II CD block. 102 villages (100%) have power supply. 102 villages (100%) have drinking water supply. 27 villages (26.47%) have post offices. 96 villages (94.12%) have telephones (including landlines, public call offices and mobile phones). 39 villages (38.24%) have a pucca (paved) approach road and 60 villages (58.82%) have transport communication (includes bus service, rail facility and navigable waterways). 22 villages (21.57%) have agricultural credit societies. 9 villages (8.82%) have banks.

In 2013-14, there were 44 fertiliser depots, 1 seed stores and 36 fair price shops in the CD Block.

Agriculture

Although the Bargadari Act of 1950 recognised the rights of bargadars to a higher share of crops from the land that they tilled, it was not implemented fully. Large tracts, beyond the prescribed limit of land ceiling, remained with the rich landlords. From 1977 onwards major land reforms took place in West Bengal. Land in excess of land ceiling was acquired and distributed amongst the peasants. Following land reforms land ownership pattern has undergone transformation. In 2013-14, persons engaged in agriculture in Ausgram II CD Block could be classified as follows: bargadars 8.04%, patta (document) holders 17.93%, small farmers (possessing land between 1 and 2 hectares) 4.03%, marginal farmers (possessing land up to 1 hectare) 13.49% and agricultural labourers 56.51%.

In 2003-04 net cropped area in Ausgram II CD Block was 22,705 hectares and the area in which more than one crop was grown was 7,455 hectares.

In 2013-14, Ausgram II CD Block produced 65,031 tonnes of Aman paddy, the main winter crop from 21,982 hectares, 4,821 tonnes of Boro paddy (spring crop) from 1,462 hectares, 538 tonnes of wheat from 200 hectares and 6,640 tonnes of potatoes from 539 hectares. It also produced pulses and oilseeds.

In Bardhaman district as a whole Aman paddy constituted 64.32% of the total area under paddy cultivation, while the area under Boro and Aus paddy constituted 32.87% and 2.81% respectively. The expansion of Boro paddy cultivation, with higher yield rates, was the result of expansion of irrigation system and intensive cropping. In 2013-14, the total area irrigated in Ausgram II CD Block was 11,968.93 hectares, out of which 11,593.64 hectares were irrigated by canal water, 229.71 hectares by river lift irrigation and 145.58 hectares by deep tube wells.

Banking
In 2013-14, Ausgram II CD Block had offices of 6 commercial banks and 4 gramin banks.

Transport

Ausgram II CD Block has 8 originating/ terminating bus routes.

The Khana-Barharwa section of Sahibganj Loop passes through the CD Block and there is a station at Bhedia.

Education
In 2013-14, Ausgram II CD Block had 133 primary schools with 8,691 students, 7 middle schools with 469 students, 15 high school with 8,049 students and 6 higher secondary schools with 6,560 students. Ausgram II CD Block had 343 institutions for special and non-formal education with 12,025 students

As per the 2011 census, in Ausgram II CD block, amongst the 102 inhabited villages, 5 villages did not have a school, 52 villages had two or more primary schools, 37 villages had at least 1 primary and 1 middle school and 25 villages had at least 1 middle and 1 secondary school.

More than 6,000 schools (in erstwhile Bardhaman district) serve cooked midday meal to more than 900,000 students.

Healthcare
In 2014, Ausgram II CD Block had 1 block primary health centre and 5 primary health centres with total 39 beds and 7 doctors (excluding private bodies). It had 20 family welfare subcentres. 2,570 patients were treated indoor and 241,627 patients were treated outdoor in the hospitals, health centres and subcentres of the CD Block.

Jamtara block primary health centre at Jamtara, PO Amragar (with 15 beds) is the main medical facility in Ausgram II CD block. There are primary health centres at Amarpur PO Aduria (with 6 beds), Bahadurpur, PO Abhirampur (with 4 beds), Bhatkunda (with 4 beds), Bhedia (with 10 beds) and Ramnagar (with 6 beds).

External links
 District map showing blocks

References

Community development blocks in Purba Bardhaman district